Rhyl Lifeboat Station is located in the North Wales town of Rhyl and is part of the RNLI. For over 150 years, the Lifeboat Crew in Rhyl have been saving lives at sea. The first lifeboat was stationed in the town in 1853 and the present station was opened in December 2001. The station operates a Shannon class all-weather boat (ALB) and an IB1 inshore lifeboat (ILB).

History 

In 1852, the Shipwrecked Fishermen and Mariner’s Society placed a lifeboat at Rhyl. Shortly after, in 1853, the lifeboat "Gwylan y Mor", capsized with the loss of six of her crew.

In 1963, Rhyl Lifeboat (Anthony Robert Marshall) was launched on service to the first lifeboat rescue of a hovercraft. For this service, the RNLI silver  medal for gallantry was awarded to Coxswain Harold Campini.

In 1967, the first D Class ILB Lifeboat was put on service in Rhyl to accompany the All-Weather Lifeboat for inshore rescues.

In 1973, the RNLI bronze  medal for gallantry was awarded to Helmsman Don Archer-Jones for the courage and seamanship he displayed when the ILB rescued 2 boys cut off by the tide, and clinging to a perch marking the sewer outfall between Rhyl and Prestatyn, in a gale force westerly wind and a rough sea on 7 August. Crew member Paul Frost was awarded a medal service certificate.

In 2002, The Duke of Kent, presented the lifeboat station with an anniversary Vellum to celebrate the 150th anniversary of Rhyl lifeboat.

Description
The lifeboat station is built on the promenade in Rhyl. The building contains the All-Weather Lifeboat (ALB), Inshore Lifeboat (ILB), Shannon Launch & Recovery System (SLRS), marinised County Tractor & Land Rover Defender used for Search and Rescue operations off the coast of Rhyl. The station also has a short concrete slipway that leads down to the beach. Each boat is kept on a carriage attached to a tractor which propels it down to the water and brings it back after use. A fund-raising shop is situated on the west side of the boathouse.

Area of operation
The lifeboat covers from Colwyn Bay (west) to Mostyn (east). North of the station the All-Weather lifeboat covers the Oil and Gas platforms of the Douglas and Hamilton fields, and also the windfarms of North Hoyle; Rhyl Flats; and the Gwynt-Y-Mor fields. Rhyl Lifeboat is a part of the contingency plan for any evacuation of the rigs. The area also covers the outer approaches to Liverpool. Adjacent ALBs are at Llandudno Lifeboat Station to the west, and Hoylake to the east. There is also an ILB at Flint to the east.

Fleet

All Weather Boats

Inshore Lifeboats

Notable Rescues
 1962 - ALB, First service ever made by a lifeboat to a hovercraft 
 1973 - ILB, Rescue to children stuck on sewer outfall 
 1990 - Towyn and Pensarn floods 
 2011 - ALB, Rescue kayaker with hypothermia 
 2011 - ILB, Rescue to mother and son with hypothermia 
 2012 - ALB, Rescue to cargo ship in Llanddulas

See also
 Royal National Lifeboat Institution

References

External links
 Rhyl Lifeboat Station website
 Official RNLI Rhyl Lifeboat Station webpage

Lifeboat stations in Wales
Lifeboat station
Transport infrastructure completed in 1853